The following lists events that happened during 1950 in the Union of Soviet Socialist Republics.

Incumbents
 General Secretary of the Communist Party of the Soviet Union – Joseph Stalin
 Chairman of the Presidium of the Supreme Soviet of the Soviet Union – Nikolay Shvernik
 Chairman of the Council of Ministers of the Soviet Union – Joseph Stalin

Events

January
 5 January – 1950 Sverdlovsk air disaster

February
 14 February – The Sino-Soviet Treaty of Friendship, Alliance and Mutual Assistance is concluded.

March
 12 March – Soviet Union legislative election, 1950

April
 2 April – Drifting ice station North Pole-2 is established.

June
 28 June – 4 July – The Pavlovian session is held.

August
 13 August – The steamer Mayakovsky sinks in Riga, killing 147 people in the deadliest peacetime Soviet shipping disaster.

Births
 12 May – Viktor Ivanov, director of the Federal Narcotics Control Service
 11 August – Gennadiy Nikonov, weapons designer
 1 September – Mikhail Fradkov, politician
 11 December – Alexander Tatarsky, film director

Deaths
 8 April – Vaslav Nijinsky, ballet dancer (born 1889)

See also
 1950 in fine arts of the Soviet Union
 List of Soviet films of 1950

References

 
1950s in the Soviet Union
Years in the Soviet Union
Soviet Union
Soviet Union
Soviet Union